Dental pertains to the teeth, including dentistry. Topics related to the dentistry, the human mouth and teeth include:



A 
:Abfraction  • 
Abrasion  • 
:Academy of General Dentistry  • 
:Acinic cell carcinoma  • 
:Acrodont  • 
:Adalbert J. Volck  • 
:Adenomatoid odontogenic tumor  • 
:Adhesive Dentistry  • 
:Aetna  • 
Agar  • 
:Aggregatibacter actinomycetemcomitans  • 
:Aim toothpaste  • 
:Akers' clasp  • 
:Alberta Dental Association and College  • 
:Alfred Fones  • 
:Alfred P. Southwick  • 
:Alginic acid  • 
:Alice Timander  • 
:Allan G. Brodie  • 
:Alveolar bony defects  • 
:Alveolar osteitis  • 
:Alveolar process of maxilla  • 
:Alveolar ridge  • 
Amalgam  • 
:Ameloblast  • 
:Ameloblastic fibroma  • 
:Ameloblastin  • 
:Ameloblastoma  • 
:Amelogenesis  • 
:Amelogenesis imperfecta  • 
:Amelogenin  • 
:American Academy of Cosmetic Dentistry  • 
:American Academy of Periodontology  • 
:American Association of Endodontists  • 
:American Association of Orthodontists  • 
:American Dental Association  • 
:American Dental Education Association  • 
:American Dental Hygienists' Association  • 
:American Society of Dental Surgeons  • 
:American Student Dental Association  • 
:Amosan  • 
Anbesol  • 
:Angular cheilitis  • 
:Anodontia  • 
:Anthony Hamilton-Smith, 3rd Baron Colwyn  • 
:Antoni Cieszyński  • 
:Apert syndrome  • 
:Apex locator  • 
:Aphthous ulcer  • 
:Applied kinesiology  • 
:Aquafresh  • 
:Archwire  • 
:Arizona Dental Association  • 
Arm & Hammer  • 
:Armin Abron  • 
:Articaine  • 
:Articulator  • 
Attrition  • 
:Australian Dental Association  • 
:Automatic toothpaste dispenser  •

B 
:Badri Teymourtash  • 
:Baltimore College of Dental Surgery  • 
:Barbed broach  • 
Barry Cockcroft  • 
:Barodontalgia  • 
:Bartholomew Ruspini  • 
:Baylor College of Dentistry  • 
Ben Harper  • 
:Ben Humble  • 
:Ben L. Salomon  • 
:Benign lymphoepithelial lesion  • 
:Bernard J. Cigrand  • 
:Bernard Nadler  • 
:Bessie Delany  • 
Bill Allen  • 
:Bill Emmerson  • 
:Bill Osmanski  • 
:Billy Cannon  • 
:Bioactive glass  • 
:Biodontics  • 
:Black hairy tongue  • 
:Bleeding on probing  • 
:Botryoid odontogenic cyst  • 
:Brachydont  • 
:Brachygnathism  • 
:Breath spray  • 
Bridge  • 
:Bristol-Myers Squibb  • 
:British Dental Association  • 
:British Dental Health Foundation  • 
:British Dental Students' Association  • 
:British Orthodontic Society  • 
:British Society of Oral Implantology  • 
:Bruxism  • 
:Buccal bifurcation cyst  • 
:Buccal mucosa  • 
:Buccal space  •

C 
:CAD/CAM Dentistry  • 
:Calcifying epithelial odontogenic tumor  • 
:Calcifying odontogenic cyst  • 
:Calcium hydroxide  • 
Calculus  • 
:California Dental Association  • 
:Canadian Association of Orthodontists  • 
Canadian College of Dental Health  • 
:Canadian Dental Association  • 
:Canalicular adenoma  • 
:Canine tooth  • 
Cantilever mechanics  • 
:Carbon dioxide laser  • 
:Caries vaccine  • 
:Carnassial  • 
:Case School of Dental Medicine  • 
:Cattle age determination  • 
:Cemento-osseous dysplasia  • 
:Cementoblast  • 
:Cementoblastoma  • 
:Cementoenamel junction  • 
:Cementogenesis  • 
:Cementum  • 
:Central giant cell granuloma  • 
:Central odontogenic fibroma  • 
:Central ossifying fibroma  • 
:Central Regional Dental Testing Service  • 
:Centric relation  • 
:Centro Escolar University  • 
:CEREC  • 
:Cervical loop  • 
:Chapin A. Harris  • 
:Chapped lips  • 
:Charles G. Maurice  • 
:Charles Goodall Lee  • 
:Charles H. Strub  • 
:Charles Murray Turpin  • 
:Charles Spence Bate  • 
:Charles Stent  • 
:Charlie Norwood  • 
:Cheilitis  • 
:Chewable toothbrush  • 
:Chewiness  • 
Chief Dental Officer  • 
:Chlorhexidine  • 
:Christian Medical and Dental Fellowship of Australia  • 
:Christian Medical and Dental Society  • 
:Church and Dwight  • 
Cingulum  • 
:Cleft lip and palate  • 
:Colgate-Palmolive  • 
Colgate  • 
:Commonly used terms of relationship and comparison in dentistry  • 
:Concrescence  • 
:Condensing osteitis  • 
:Configuration factor  • 
:Congenital epulis  • 
:Consultant Orthodontists Group  • 
:Cosmetic dentistry  • 
Crest  • 
:Crossbite  • 
:Crouzon syndrome  • 
:Crown-to-root ratio  • 
Crown  • 
Crown  • 
:Crown lengthening  • 
:Crunchiness  • 
:Curve of spee  • 
Cusp  • 
:Cusp of Carabelli  •

D 
:Dappen glass  • 
:Dan Crane  • 
:Darlie  • 
:David J. Acer  • 
:Deciduous  • 
:Deciduous teeth  • 
:Delta Dental  • 
:Dens evaginatus  • 
:Dens invaginatus  • 
:Dental-enamel junction  • 
:Dental Admission Test  • 
:Dental alveolus  • 
:Dental amalgam controversy  • 
:Dental anatomy  • 
:Dental antibiotic prophylaxis  • 
:Dental anesthesia  • 
:Dental arches  • 
:Dental assistant  • 
:Dental avulsion  • 
:Dental auxiliary  • 
:Dental barotrauma  • 
:Dental braces  • 
:Dental bur  • 
:Dental canaliculi  • 
:Dental care in adolescent Australians  • 
:Dental care of Guantanamo Bay detainees  • 
:Dental caries  • 
:Dental college  • 
:Dental composite  • 
:Dental Council of India  • 
:Dental cyst  • 
:Dental dam  • 
:Dental disease  • 
:Dental drill  • 
:Dental emergency  • 
:Dental engine  • 
:Dental floss  • 
:Dental fluorosis  • 
:Dental follicle  • 
:Dental hygienist  • 
:Dental implant  • 
:Dental informatics  • 
:Dental instruments  • 
:Dental key  • 
:Dental Laboratories Association  • 
:Dental laboratory  • 
:Dental lamina  • 
:Dental laser  • 
:Dental midline  • 
:Dental notation  • 
:Dental papilla  • 
:Dental pathology  • 
:Dental pellicle  • 
:Dental phobia  • 
:Dental plaque  • 
:Dental porcelain  • 
:Dental Practitioners' Association  • 
:Dental public health  • 
:Dental pulp stem cells  • 
:Dental radiography  • 
:Dental restoration  • 
:Dental restorative materials  • 
:Dental sealant  • 
:Dental spa  • 
:Dental subluxation  • 
:Dental surgery  • 
:Dental syringe  • 
:Dental technician  • 
:Dental Technologists Association  • 
:Dental therapist  • 
:Dental trauma  • 
:DenTek Oral Care  • 
:Dentifrice  • 
:Dentigerous Cyst  • 
:Dentin  • 
:Dentin dysplasia  • 
:Dentine bonding agents  • 
:Dentine hypersensitivity  • 
:Dentinogenesis  • 
:Dentinogenesis imperfecta  • 
:Dentistry  • 
:Dentistry Magazine  • 
:Dentistry throughout the world  • 
:Dentition  • 
:Dentition analysis  • 
:Dentrix  • 
:Dentures  • 
:Denturist  • 
:Desquamative gingivitis  • 
:Diane Legault  • 
Diastema  • 
:Dilaceration  • 
:Doc Holliday  • 
:Don McLeroy  • 
:Donald Leake  • 
:Dr. Alban  • 
:Dr. Radley Tate  • 
:Dr. Tariq Faraj  •

E 
:E. Lloyd Du Brul  • 
:Eagle syndrome  • 
:Early childhood caries  • 
:Eastman Kodak  • 
:Ed Lafitte  • 
:Eco-friendly dentistry  • 
:Edentulism  • 
:Edward Angle  • 
:Edward Hudson (dentist)  • 
:Edward Maynard  • 
:Egg tooth  • 
:Electric toothbrush  • 
:Elmex  • 
:Elsie Gerlach  • 
Embrasure  • 
:Enamel cord  • 
:Enamel knot  • 
:Enamel lamellae  • 
:Enamel niche  • 
:Enamel organ  • 
:Enamel pearl  • 
:Enamel rod  • 
:Enamel spindles  • 
:Enamel tufts  • 
:Enamelin  • 
:Endodontic therapy  • 
:Endodontics  • 
:Epulis fissuratum  • 
:Er:YAG laser  • 
Erosion  • 
:Eruption cyst  • 
:Erythroplakia  • 
:Euthymol  • 
:Ewald Fabian  • 
Explorer  • 
:External resorption  • 
Extraction  •

F 
:F. labii inferioris  • 
:Faculty of Dental Surgery  • 
:Faculty of General Dental Practice  • 
:False tooth  • 
:Fatima Jinnah Dental College  • 
:FDI World Dental Federation  • 
:FDI World Dental Federation notation  • 
:FDSRCS England  • 
:Fiberotomy  • 
:Filiform papilla  • 
:Fissured tongue  • 
:Fixed prosthodontics  • 
:Florida Dental Association  • 
:Fluoride therapy  • 
:Focal infection  • 
:Foliate papillae  • 
:Forensic dentistry  • 
:Frank Abbott (dentist)  • 
:Frank Crowther  • 
:Frederick B. Moorehead  • 
:Frederick Bogue Noyes  • 
:Frederick J. Conboy  • 
:Free gingival margin  • 
:Frenulum linguae  • 
:Frey's syndrome  • 
:Fungiform papilla  •

G 
:G. Walter Dittmar  • 
:Gardner's syndrome  • 
:Gargling  • 
:Gaspard Fauteux  • 
:Gene Derricotte  • 
:General Dental Council  • 
:General Practice Residency  • 
:Geographic tongue  • 
:Georg Carabelli  • 
:George S. Long  • 
:Gerald Cardinale  • 
:Geriatric dentistry  • 
:Gerrit Wolsink  • 
:Giant cell fibroma  • 
:Gigantiform cementoma  • 
:Gingiva  • 
:Gingival and periodontal pockets  • 
:Gingival cyst of the adult  • 
:Gingival cyst of the newborn  • 
:Gingival enlargement  • 
:Gingival fibers  • 
:Gingival sulcus  • 
:Gingivectomy  • 
:Gingivitis  • 
:Giovanni Battista Orsenigo  • 
:Glandular odontogenic cyst  • 
:Glasgow Dental Hospital and School  • 
:Glass ionomer cement  • 
:GlaxoSmithKline  • 
:Gleem toothpaste  • 
:Glennon Engleman  • 
:Globulomaxillary cyst  • 
:Glossitis  • 
:Gnarled enamel  • 
:Gnathology  • 
:Gold teeth  • 
:Goldman School of Dental Medicine  • 
:Gomphosis  • 
Göran Lindblad  • 
:Government Dental College, Bangalore  • 
:Granular cell tumor  • 
:Greene Vardiman Black  • 
:Gum graft  • 
:Gunadasa Amarasekara  • 
:Gustatory system  •

H 
:Halimeter  • 
:Halitosis  • 
:Hammaspeikko  • 
:Hard palate  • 
:Harold Albrecht  • 
:Harvard School of Dental Medicine  • 
:Head and neck anatomy  • 
:Head and neck cancer  • 
:Healing of periapical lesions  • 
:Henry D. Cogswell  • 
:Henry Schein  • 
:Henry Trendley Dean  • 
:Hertwig's epithelial root sheath  • 
:Heterodont  • 
:Hexetidine  • 
:History of dental treatments  • 
:Horace H. Hayden  • 
:Horace Wells  • 
:Horse teeth  • 
:Hydrodynamic theory (dentistry)  • 
:Hyperdontia  • 
:Hypocone  • 
:Hypodontia  • 
:Hypoglossia  • 
:Hypsodont  •

I 
:I.P. Dental College  • 
:Ian Gainsford  • 
:Idiopathic osteosclerosis  • 
:Implantology  • 
:Implant-supported bridge  • 
Impression  • 
:Incisor  • 
:Inferior alveolar nerve  • 
:Inflammatory papillary hyperplasia  • 
:Ingestion  • 
:Inlays and onlays  • 
:Inner enamel epithelium  • 
:Interdental brush  • 
:Interdental papilla  • 
:Interdental plate  • 
:Internal resorption  • 
:International Association for Dental Research  • 
:Interrod enamel  • 
:Invisalign  • 
:Ipana  • 
:Isaac Schour  •

J 
Jack Miller  • 
:James Garretson  • 
:James W. Holley, III  • 
:Jan Boubli  • 
:Jim Harrell, Jr.  • 
:Jim Lonborg  • 
John Haase  • 
John Smith  • 
:Johnson & Johnson  • 
:Jon Sudbø  • 
:Journal of Periodontology  • 
:Journal of the American Dental Association  • 
:Julius Franks  • 
:Junaid Ismail Dockrat  • 
:Junctional epithelium  •

K 
:Ken Cranston  • 
:Kolynos  • 
:Korff fibers  •

L 
:Laser diode  • 
:Laser scalpel  • 
:Lateral periodontal cyst  • 
:Lentulo spiral  • 
:Lester C. Hunt  • 
:Leukoedema  • 
:Leukoplakia  • 
:Licentiate in Dental Surgery  • 
:Lichen planus  • 
:Lie bumps  • 
Ligature  • 
Linea alba  • 
:Lingual tonsils  • 
Lion  • 
:Lip  • 
:Lip frenulum piercing  • 
:Lip piercing  • 
:Lip Reconstruction  • 
:List of dental organizations  • 
:List of dental schools in Australia  • 
:List of dental schools in the United States  • 
:List of dentists  • 
:List of toothpaste brands  • 
:Listerine  • 
:Louis Pendleton  • 
:Loupe  • 
:Low intensity pulsed ultrasound  • 
:Lucy Hobbs Taylor  • 
:Luting agent  •

M 
Macrodontia  • 
:Malocclusion  • 
:Mammelon  • 
:Mandibular advancement splint  • 
:Mandibular canine  • 
:Mandibular central incisor  • 
:Mandibular first molar  • 
:Mandibular first premolar  • 
:Mandibular lateral incisor  • 
:Mandibular second molar  • 
:Mandibular second premolar  • 
:Mandibular third molar  • 
:Manipal College of Dental Sciences, Manipal  • 
:Manipal College of Dental Sciences, Mangalore  • 
:Marian Spore Bush  • 
:Markus Merk  • 
:Martin van Butchell  • 
:Mastication  • 
:Maury Massler  • 
:Maxilla  • 
:Maxillary canine  • 
:Maxillary central incisor  • 
:Maxillary first molar  • 
:Maxillary first premolar  • 
:Maxillary lateral incisor  • 
:Maxillary second molar  • 
:Maxillary second premolar  • 
:Maxillary third molar  • 
:Maximum intercuspation  • 
:Median alveolar cyst  • 
:Median palatal cyst  • 
:Melbourne Faculty of Dentistry  • 
:Mentadent  • 
:Metacone  • 
:Metastatic tumor of jaws  • 
:Meth mouth  • 
:MFDS  • 
:Michael Krop  • 
:Micro Surgical Endodontics  • 
:Microdontia  • 
:Mike Simpson  • 
:Miles Dewey Davis, Jr.  • 
:Minimal intervention dentistry  • 
:Miswak  • 
Molar  • 
:Morinosuke Chiwaki  • 
:Mouth  • 
:Mouth assessment  • 
:Mouth breathing  • 
:Mouth disease  • 
:Mouth mirror  • 
:Mouth prop  • 
:Mouthguard  • 
:Mouthwash  • 
:Mucocele  • 
:Mucoepidermoid carcinoma  • 
:Mucogingival junction  • 
:Mucosal lichen planus  • 
:Mucous membrane pemphigoid  • 
:Mucous retention cyst  • 
:MUDH  • 
:Mumps  • 
:Mutually protected occlusion  •

N 
:Nasolabial cyst  • 
:Nasopalatine cyst  • 
:National Institute of Dental and Craniofacial Research  • 
:NBDE  • 
:Nd:YAG laser  • 
:Neonatal line  • 
:Neonatal teeth  • 
:Nevus  • 
:New York State Dental Association  • 
:New York University College of Dentistry  • 
:Nicotine stomatitis  • 
:Nikolsky's sign  • 
:Nobel Biocare  • 
:Norman Simmons  • 
:Northeast Regional Board of Dental Examiners  • 
:Northern Indian Medical & Dental Association of Canada  • 
:Northwestern University Dental School  •

O 
:Obligate nasal breathing  • 
:Occlusal splint  • 
:Occlusal trauma  • 
Occlusion  • 
:Odontoblast  • 
:Odontoblast process  • 
:Odontode  • 
:Odontogenesis  • 
:Odontogenic keratocyst  • 
:Odontogenic myxoma  • 
:Odontogenic cyst  • 
:Odontoma  • 
:Ohaguro  • 
:Ohio College of Dental Surgery  • 
:Ohio Dental Association  • 
:Oil of cloves  • 
:Oil pulling  • 
:Olaflur  • 
:Omega Pharma  • 
:Ontario Dental Association  • 
:Open Dental  • 
Orabase B  • 
Oral-B  • 
:Oral candidiasis  • 
:Oral and maxillofacial radiology  • 
:Oral and maxillofacial surgery  • 
:Oral cancer  • 
Oral hygiene  • Oral care swab  • 
:Oral irrigator  • 
:Oral medicine  • 
:Oral microbiology  • 
:Oral mucosa  • 
:Oral pathology  • 
:Oral Surgery  • 
:Oral torus  • 
:Oral ulcer  • 
:Orofacial granulomatosis  • 
:Orson Hodge  • 
:Orthodontic Facemask & Reverse-Pull Headgear  • 
:Orthodontic headgear  • 
:Orthodontic spacer  • 
:Orthodontic Technicians Association  • 
:Orthodontic technology  • 
:Orthodontics  • 
:Orthopantomogram  • 
:Orville Howard Phillips  • 
:Oscar Willing  • 
Osseointegrated implant  • 
:Osteonecrosis of the jaw  • 
:Osteoporotic bone marrow defect  • 
:Our Lady of Fatima University  • 
:Outer enamel epithelium  •

P 
:Painless Parker  • 
:Pakistan Medical and Dental Council  • 
:Palatal expander  • 
:Palate  • 
:Palatine uvula  • 
:Palmer notation  • 
:Parafunctional habit  • 
:Parotid gland  • 
:Patterson Dental  • 
:Paul Beresford  • 
:Paul N. Cyr  • 
:Pedodontics  • 
:Pemphigus  • 
:Peninsula College of Medicine and Dentistry  • 
:Pennsylvania College of Dental Surgery  • 
:Pepsodent  • 
:Periapical abscess  • 
:Periapical cyst  • 
:Pericoronitis  • 
:Perikyma  • 
:Periodontal curette  • 
:Periodontal ligament  • 
:Periodontal probe  • 
:Periodontal scaler  • 
:Periodontitis  • 
:Periodontitis as a manifestation of systemic disease  • 
:Periodontium  • 
:Periodontology  • 
:Peripheral giant-cell granuloma  • 
:Peripheral odontogenic fibroma  • 
:Peripheral ossifying fibroma  • 
:Permanent teeth  • 
:Peter Kunter  • 
:Peutz–Jeghers syndrome  • 
:Piercing  • 
:Phil Samis  • 
:Philip A. Traynor  • 
:Philip Blaiberg  • 
:Philtrum  • 
:Pierre Corbeil  • 
:Pierre Fauchard  • 
:Pink tooth of Mummery  • 
:Pleomorphic adenoma  • 
:Pleurodont  • 
:Plica fimbriata  • 
:Polk E. Akers  • 
:Polymorphous low-grade adenocarcinoma  • 
:Polynoxylin  • 
:Polyvinyl siloxane  • 
:Post-canine megadontia  • 
:Post and core  • 
:Posterior tongue  • 
:Potassium alginate  • 
:Premolar  • 
Preparation  • 
:Primordial cyst  • 
:Procaine  • 
:Procter & Gamble  • 
:Prognathism  • 
:Prosthodontics  • 
:Protocone  • 
Pulp  • 
:Pulp polyp  • 
:Pyogenic granuloma  •

Q 
:Quad Helix  •

R 
:Rabab Fetieh  • 
:Radial composite deviation  • 
:Radioactive dentin abrasion  • 
:Ragas Dental College  • 
:Raman Bedi  • 
:Randy Starr  • 
:Ranula  • 
:Receding gums  • 
:Reduced enamel epithelium  • 
:Regenerative endodontics  • 
:Regional odontodysplasia  • 
:Removable partial denture  • 
Retainer  • 
:Retromolar space  • 
:Riggs' disease  • 
Robert Blake  • 
:Roberto Calderoli  • 
:Rod sheath  • 
:Rodrigues Ottolengui  • 
Roger Bailey  • 
:Root canal  • 
:Root End Surgery  • 
:Root resorption  • 
:Royal Australasian College of Dental Surgeons  • 
:Royal College of Dental Surgeons of Ontario  • 
:Royal College of Dentists  • 
:Royal College of Surgeons of England  •

S 
:Saint Apollonia  • 
:Salivary gland  • 
:Samir Ghawshah  • 
:Samuel Bemis  • 
:Samuel Cartwright  • 
:Scaling and root planing  • 
:Schulich School of Medicine & Dentistry  • 
Scope  • 
:Secondary palate  • 
:Segmental odontomaxillary dysplasia  • 
:Sheila Faith  • 
:Shovel-shaped incisors  • 
:Sialogram  • 
Signal  • 
:Simon Hullihen  • 
:Sinodonty and Sundadonty  • 
:Sinus-lift procedure  • 
Smiley's Good Teeth Puppet Theatre  • 
:Socket preservation  • 
:Sodium alginate  • 
:Soft palate  • 
:SoftDent  • 
:SOHP  • 
:Sonicare  • 
:Southern Regional Testing Agency  • 
:Sozodont  • 
:Speech organ  • 
:Squamous odontogenic tumor  • 
:Stafne defect  • 
Stan Brown  • 
:Stanley D. Tylman  • 
:Stanley McInnis  • 
:Stannous fluoride  • 
:Stellate reticulum  • 
:Sten Forshufvud  • 
Steve Green  • 
Stippling  • 
:Stomatol  • 
:Stomatology  • 
:Stratum intermedium  • 
:Straumann  • 
:Striae of Retzius  • 
:Sublingual gland  • 
:Submandibular gland  • 
:Sulcular epithelium  • 
:Superior alveolar artery  • 
:Superior mouth  • 
:Supernumerary roots  • 
:Swedish Dental Association  • 
:Sydney Faculty of Dentistry  •

T 
:Talon cusp  • 
:Taste  • 
:Taste bud  • 
:Taurodontism  • 
:Teeth cleaning  • 
:Teething  • 
:Teledentistry  • 
:Temporary crown  • 
:Temporary restoration  • 
:Temporomandibular joint  • 
:Temporomandibular joint disorder  • 
:Thaddeus Weclew  • 
:Thomas Berdmore  • 
:Thomas Bramwell Welch  • 
Tim Whatley  • 
:Tom's of Maine  • 
:Tom Slade  • 
:Tomes' process  • 
:Tongue  • 
:Tongue cleaner  • 
:Tongue diseases  • 
:Tongue piercing  • 
:Tongue scraper  • 
:Tongue thrust  • 
:Tonsillolith  • 
:Tooth  • 
:Tooth-friendly  • 
:Tooth abscess  • 
:Tooth bleaching  • 
:Tooth brushing  • 
:Tooth development  • 
:Tooth enamel  • 
:Tooth eruption  • 
:Tooth fusion  • 
:Tooth gemination  • 
:Tooth loss  • 
:Tooth painting  • 
:Tooth polishing  • 
:Tooth regeneration  • 
:Tooth squeeze  • 
:Tooth Tunes  • 
:Toothache  • 
:Toothbrush  • 
:Toothpaste  • 
:Toothpick  • 
:Torus mandibularis  • 
:Torus palatinus  • 
:Traumatic bone cyst  • 
:Traumatic neuroma  • 
:Treatment of knocked-out (avulsed) teeth  • 
:Trench mouth  • 
:Treponema denticola  • 
:Trigeminal ganglion  • 
:Trismus  • 
:Tuftelin  • 
:Tufts University School of Dental Medicine  • 
:Turner's hypoplasia  • 
:Twin bloc  • 
:Typodont  •

U 
:UCLA School of Dentistry  • 
:Ultra Brite  • 
:Unilever  • 
Universal numbering system  • 
:University of Illinois at Chicago College of Dentistry  • 
:University of Pennsylvania School of Dental Medicine  • 
:University of Pittsburgh School of Dental Medicine  • 
:University of Tennessee College of Dentistry  • 
:University of the East College of Dentistry  • 
:University of Toronto Faculty of Dentistry  •

V 
Veneer  • 
:Vermillion border  • 
:Vertical dimension of occlusion  • 
:Vestibular lamina  •

W 
:Walter Koskiusko Waldowski  • 
:Warthin's tumor  • 
:Water fluoridation  • 
:Water fluoridation controversy  • 
:Western Regional Examining Board  • 
:Weston Price  • 
:White sponge nevus  • 
:Whitening strips  • 
:Wilbur Wonka  • 
:William Donald Kelley  • 
William Duff  • 
William Gibson  • 
:William Samuel Hall  • 
:William T.G. Morton  • 
:Wisdom teeth  •

X 
Xerogel  • 
Xylophagia  • 
Xerostomia  •

Y

Z 
:Zane Grey  • 
:Zinc oxide eugenol  •

See also

 List of toothpaste brands

Mouth
Works about dentistry
Oral health and dental topics